Kolanjin (also Romanized as Kolanjīn, Kalanjīn, Kolangīn, Kolenjīn, and Qūlānjīn) is a village in Kharaqan-e Sharqi Rural District, Abgarm District, Avaj County, Qazvin Province, Iran. At the 2006 census, its population was 979, in 263 families.

References 

Populated places in Avaj County